Broken Down: The EP is the third release on Flicker Records by Christian rock band Pillar. It features a demo version of the hit song "Bring Me Down" as well as live acoustic versions and studio acoustic versions of songs on Pillar's second album, Fireproof.

Track listing
 "Further From Myself" (In Studio Acoustic)  – 4:37
 "A Shame" (Live Acoustic)  – 4:53
 "Light At My Feet" (Live Acoustic)  – 3:55
 "Further From Myself" (Live Acoustic)  – 5:12
 "Fireproof" (Live Acoustic)  – 4:23
 "Bring Me Down" (EP Mix)  – 3:34

Miscellaneous information
 "Bring Me Down" was included on MX Unleashed in February 2004 and on X 2004 on March 30, 2004.
 On the back of the physical EP, tracks 4 and 5 are switched.

References

Pillar (band) albums
2003 EPs